Björn Bernt Ewald Ferm (born 10 August 1944) is a Swedish modern pentathlete. He competed at the 1968 and 1972 Summer Olympics and won an individual gold medal in 1968. In 1968, his team finished third but was stripped of the bronze medal after one member failed a drug test (for alcohol).

Ferm won two individual bronze medals at world championships, in 1967 and 1969. Nationally he collected 12 titles that included one in épée fencing and 11 in modern pentathlon, five individual and six with a team. After retiring from competitions he became an Asia-based businessman, and as of 2009 headed of a company exporting ink cartridges and toners.

References

1944 births
Living people
Swedish male modern pentathletes
Swedish male épée fencers
Olympic modern pentathletes of Sweden
Modern pentathletes at the 1968 Summer Olympics
Modern pentathletes at the 1972 Summer Olympics
Olympic gold medalists for Sweden
Olympic medalists in modern pentathlon
Competitors stripped of Summer Olympics medals
World Modern Pentathlon Championships medalists
Medalists at the 1968 Summer Olympics
Sportspeople from Jönköping
20th-century Swedish people